Fillyra is a village and a former municipality in the Rhodope regional unit, East Macedonia and Thrace, Greece. Since the 2011 local government reform it is part of the municipality Arriana, of which it is the seat and a municipal unit. The municipal unit has an area of 236.502 km2. In 2011 its population was 7,583. The Turkish name of Fillyra is Sirkeli, meaning "with vinegar".

References

Populated places in Rhodope (regional unit)